, known professionally as , is a Japanese actor and voice actor who has appeared in a number of feature films, stage productions and television series. He is represented with Amuleto.

Filmography

Stage

Films

TV series

Narration

Anime television

Advertisements

Radio

Video games

CD

As himself

As a character

Reading CD

Drama CD

DVD

Internet

Mobile

Music videos

Photo albums

Books

Dubbing
Belgravia, Charles Pope (Jack Bardoe)

References

External links
 

1987 births
Living people
Japanese male film actors
Japanese male musical theatre actors
Japanese male television actors
Japanese male video game actors
Japanese male voice actors
Male voice actors from Aichi Prefecture
People from Gamagōri
21st-century Japanese male actors